Bruno Bruni (born 25 September 1955) is a retired Italian high jumper.

Biography
He finished fifth at the 1977 European Indoor Championships, eleventh at the 1978 European Indoor Championships and eleventh at the 1980 European Indoor Championships. His personal best jump is 2.27 metres, achieved in September 1979 in Bologna.

His personal best jump is 2.27 metres, achieved on 19 September 1979 in Bologna, setting a new Italian record on the same day in which we were able Massimo Di Giorgio and Oscar Raise (exceptional event for athletics).

National records
 High jump: 2.27 m ( Bologna, 19 September 1979)

See also
 Men's high jump Italian record progression

References

External links
 
 Athlete profile at All-athletics.com

1955 births
Living people
Italian male high jumpers
People from San Vito al Tagliamento
Sportspeople from Friuli-Venezia Giulia